In many disciplines, including economics and philosophy, a normative statement expresses a value judgment about the desirability of a situation. Whereas a descriptive statement (also known as a positive statement) is meant to describe the world as it is, a normative statement is meant to talk about the world as it should be. For instance, "the world would be a better place if the moon were made of green cheese" is a normative statement because it expresses a judgment about what ought to be. Normative statements are characterised by the modal verbs "should", "would", "could" or "must". In economics, normative statements form the basis of normative economics.

See also
 Norm (philosophy)
 Normative
 Normative science
 Normative ethics
 Is–ought problem
 Opinions in epistemology

References

External links
 Economae: An Encyclopedia

Philosophy of economics
Statements